Senator Sullivan may refer to:

Members of the United States Senate
Dan Sullivan (U.S. senator) (born 1964), U.S. Senator from Alaska since 2015
Patrick Joseph Sullivan (1865–1935), U.S. Senator from Wyoming from 1929 to 1930
William V. Sullivan (1857–1918), U.S. Senator from Mississippi from 1898 to 1901

United States state senate members
Charles F. Sullivan (1904–1962), Massachusetts State Senate
Christopher D. Sullivan (1870–1942), New York State Senate
Dave Sullivan (Illinois politician) (born 1964), Illinois State Senate
Francis D. Sullivan (fl. 1960s), Ohio State Senate
George H. Sullivan (1867–1935), Minnesota State Senate
Henry P. Sullivan (1916–2003), New Hampshire State Senate
Jim Sullivan (Wisconsin politician) (born 1967), Wisconsin State Senate
John Andrew Sullivan (1868–1927), Massachusetts State Senate
John M. Sullivan (politician) (born 1959), Illinois State Senate
Kate Sullivan (legislator) (born 1950), Nebraska State Senate
Kevin Sullivan (politician) (born 1949), Connecticut State Senate 
Leo J. Sullivan (1905–1963), Massachusetts State Senate
Nancy Sullivan (politician) (born 1949), Maine State Senate
Samuel Sullivan (politician) (1773–1853), Ohio State Senate
Timothy Sullivan (1862–1913), New York State Senate
William P. Sullivan (1870–1925), Missouri State Senate
William Sullivan (Kentucky politician) (1921–2013), Kentucky State Senate

See also
Senator O'Sullivan (disambiguation)